Charles Browne Fleet (September 18, 1843 – May 12, 1916) was a pharmacist and inventor of the laxative and chapstick. His company, C.B. Fleet,  was founded in Lynchburg, Virginia, and still operates producing laxatives, douches, micro-enemas, and other products of the sort.

A native of King and Queen County, Virginia, Fleet studied at Columbian College until the advent of the American Civil War, at which point he enlisted in the Confederate Army. He then moved to Charlottesville, Virginia, living there for a time before moving to Lynchburg. He served as Secretary of the Virginia Pharmaceutical Association for twenty-three years.

References

1843 births
1916 deaths
American pharmacists
19th-century American inventors
20th-century American inventors
People from King and Queen County, Virginia
People from Lynchburg, Virginia
Businesspeople from Virginia
19th-century American businesspeople
20th-century American businesspeople
George Washington University alumni
People of Virginia in the American Civil War